The Parola railway station is located in the municipality of Hattula, Finland, in the urban area and municipal seat of Parola. It is located along the Riihimäki–Tampere railway, and its neighboring stations are Iittala in the north and Hämeenlinna in the south.

Services 

Parola is served by VR commuter rail line  on the route Helsinki–Riihimäki–Hämeenlinna–Tampere. Southbound trains toward Hämeenlinna, Riihimäki and Helsinki use track 1, while northbound trains toward Tampere use track 3. Track 2 has no platform and is only used by long-distance trains that pass through the station.

References 

Hattula
Railway stations in Kanta-Häme